Akhmatbek Keldibekov (born 16 June 1966) was the Speaker of Parliament in Kyrgyzstan as of 17 December 2010, in office until 2011. He is a member of the Ata-Zhurt party. He was elected with 101 votes in favour and 14 against as part of the formation of a new government.
Keldibekov was arrested in November 2013 and charged with abuse of office and financial misdeeds, sparking protests in his native region of Osh in the country's south.  His supporters insist that his arrest is politically motivated.

References

Chairmen of the Supreme Council (Kyrgyzstan)
1966 births
Living people